The Zlin 22 Junak was a 1940s two-seat cabin monoplane, developed from the Zlin 381 (a licence-built Bücker Bü 181).

Development
Although based on the Zlin 381, the Junak had side-by-side seating for two. It was a low-wing cantilever monoplane with a conventional tailwheel landing gear. It was powered by a nose-mounted 75 hp (56 kW) Praga D engine, although the prototype had a 57 hp (43 kW) Persy III engine. A three-seat variant, the Zlin 22M, was developed and two prototypes of a three/four-seat tourer variant, the Zlin 122, were built.

Variants
Zlin Z 22
Prototype with a  Persy III engine.
Zlin Z 22D
Production two-seat variant with a  Praga D engine.
Zlin Z 22M
Three-seat variant with a ) Walter Minor 4-III engine.
Zlin Z 122
Three/four seat development with a 105hp (78kW) Zlin Toma 4 engine, two prototypes only.

Operators
The 50 pcs Zlín Z-22 was exported into Romania and other 25 pcs to other WE states.

Czechoslovakian Air Force

Specifications (22D)

References

Notes

Bibliography
 
 
 

1940s Czechoslovakian civil utility aircraft
22
Single-engined tractor aircraft
Low-wing aircraft
Aircraft first flown in 1947